Sultanpur is a town and a nagar panchayat in Raisen district in the Indian state of Madhya Pradesh.

Geography
It has an average elevation of 366 metres (1200 feet).

Demographics
 India census, Sultanpur had a population of 8716. Males constitute 54% of the population and females 46%. Sultanpur has an average literacy rate of 57%, lower than the national average of 59.5%: male literacy is 63%, and female literacy is 50%. In Sultanpur, 18% of the population is under 6 years of age.

References

Raisen
Cities and towns in Raisen district